The second round of qualifying matches for the 2010 FIFA World Cup from the CONCACAF section featured the 13 top-ranked CONCACAF teams in the FIFA World Rankings as of May 2007, along with the 11 winning teams from the First Round. The draw took place on 25 November 2007 in Durban, South Africa.

Format
In this round 12 of the remaining 24 teams would be eliminated. There were 12 ties and the winners advanced to the next round. All games were scheduled to be played in home and away format. Further organisation were involved in the draw, with the 12 ties grouped into three groups of four – each feeding into a separate Third Round group. Within each group of four ties, one tie included a team ranked 1–3, one included a team ranked 4–6 and two included teams ranked 7–12. The 13th ranked side (who received a bye in the first round), were ensured a tie against a team ranked 7–12. All other ties were against First Round Winners.

Group 1

Group 1A

United States won 9–0 on aggregate.

Group 1B

Guatemala won 9–1 on aggregate.

Group 1C

Trinidad and Tobago won 3–2 on aggregate.

Group 1D

Cuba won 8–3 on aggregate.

Group 2

Group 2A

Mexico won 9–0 on aggregate.

Group 2B

Jamaica won 13–0 on aggregate.

Group 2C

Honduras won 6–2 on aggregate.

Group 2D

Canada won 7–1 on aggregate.

Group 3

Group 3A

Costa Rica won 5–2 on aggregate.

Group 3B

Suriname won 3–1 on aggregate.

Group 3C

El Salvador won 3–2 on aggregate.

Group 3D

Haiti won 1–0 on aggregate.

Goalscorers
A total of 90 goals were scored over 24 games, for an average of 3.75 goals per game.

5 goals
 Luton Shelton

4 goals

 Ali Gerba
 Carlos Ruíz

3 goals

 Roberto Linares
 David Suazo
 Jared Borgetti

2 goals

 Kerry Skepple
 John Barry Nusum
 Dwayne De Rosario
 Jaine Valencia
 Eliseo Quintanilla
 Gonzalo Romero
 Abner Trigueros
 Wilson Palacios
 Deon Burton
 Carlos Vela
 Fernando Arce
 Clifton Sandvliet
 Stern John
 Brian Ching
 Clint Dempsey

1 goal

 Tyio Simon
 Issey Nakajima-Farran
 Álvaro Saborío
 Armando Alonso
 Bryan Ruiz
 Randall Azofeifa
 Victor Núñez
 Jaime Colomé
 Leonel Duarte
 Jeniel Márquez
 Luis Anaya
 Jason Roberts
 Patrick Modeste
 Mario Rafael Rodríguez
 Nigel Codrington
 Julio César de León
 Demar Phillips
 Ian Goodison
 Marlon King
 Omar Daley
 Ricardo Gardner
 Tyrone Marshall
 Andrés Guardado
 Luis Tejada
 José Luis Garcés
 Chris Megaloudis
 Petter Villegas
 Kenwin McPhee
 Marlon James
 Germaine van Dijk
 Darryl Roberts
 Eddie Johnson
 Eddie Lewis
 Landon Donovan
 Michael Bradley

1 own goal

 Daryl Ferguson (playing against United States)
 Tervor Lennen (against Mexico)
 Eugene Martha (against Haiti)

Notes

References

External links
FIFA.com

2010 FIFA World Cup qualification (CONCACAF)
Qual
qualification 1
qualification 1
qualification 1